Monteforte Irpino is a town and comune in the province of Avellino, Campania, Italy. A bus crash near the town killed 40 people in 2013.

References

Cities and towns in Campania